Bard Nordlund is an American curler and three-time national champion from Seattle, Washington.

Curling career
In 1988 Nordlund played third on Doug Jones' national champion team; they went on to finish in tenth place at the World Championship. The following year Nordlund returned to Nationals on Jim Vukich's team and again winning and placing tenth at World's. In 1990 Nordlund returned to Jones' team and again won gold at the National Championship, this time improving to seventh at World's.

Teams

References

External links 

American male curlers
American curling champions
Sportspeople from Seattle